The 1996 Jade Solid Gold Best Ten Music Awards Presentation was held in January 1997. It is part of the Jade Solid Gold Best Ten Music Awards Presentation series held in Hong Kong.

Top 10 song awards
The top 10 songs (十大勁歌金曲) of 1996 are as follows.

Additional awards

References
 Top ten songs award 1996, Tvcity.tvb.com
 Additional awards 1996, Tvcity.tvb.com

Jade Solid Gold Best Ten Music Awards Presentation, 1996